Gergis, also known as Gergithus (Γέργιθος) or Gergitha (Γέργιθα) or Gergithes (Γέργιθες), and later Kerge, was a town in ancient Troad, on the north of the Scamander River. It was inhabited, according to Herodotus, by descendants of the mythical Teucrians. Herodotus also records that it was passed by the Persian army of Xerxes I on the way to Abydos in 480 BCE. In the time of Xenophon Gergis is called a strong place; it had an acropolis and strong walls, and was one of the chief towns of the Dardanian princess Mania. King Attalus of Pergamus transplanted the inhabitants of Gergis to a place near the sources of the Caicus, whence we afterwards find a place called Gergetha or Gergithion, near Larissa Phrikonis, in the territory of Cyme. The old town of Gergis was believed by some to have been the birthplace of the Sibyl, whence coins found there have the image of the prophetess impressed upon them.

Cephalion (Κεφαλίων) or Cephalon (Κεφάλων) of Gergis was a rhetor and historian during the reign of Hadrian. He left his city because of enmity with its rulers and went to Sicily. He wrote many works in Ionic Greek.

Its site is located near Karınkalı, Asiatic Turkey.

References

Populated places in ancient Troad
Former populated places in Turkey
Locations in Greek mythology
History of Çanakkale Province
Ancient Greek archaeological sites in Turkey